A pie is a baked food, with a shell usually made of pastry.

Pie or PIE may also refer to:

Places

Canada
Pie Island, Ontario
Pie-IX Boulevard, Montreal

United States
Pie, West Virginia
"Sedgwick Pie", a family burial plot in Stockbridge, Massachusetts
St. Pete–Clearwater International Airport (IATA code), Florida

Elsewhere
Pan Island Expressway, Singapore
Pie de la Cuesta, Guerrero, Mexico
Pié La Costa, L'Aquila, Italy
Pie-d'Orezza, Corsica, France
San Rafael Pie de la Cuesta, Guatemala

People
Pie (surname), people with this surname
Pie Allen, American prospector, businessman, and politician
Pie Corbett, English educational writer and poet
Pie Geelen, Dutch freestyle swimmer
Pié Masumbuko, Burundian politician
Pie Traynor, American professional baseball player

Arts, entertainment, and media

Music
"Pie" (song), by Future, 2017
"The Pie", a 1972 song by Sutherland Brothers & Quiver

Television
"The Pie" (Seinfeld), a 1994 Seinfeld episode
"The Pie", a 2011 Bananas in Pyjamas episode

Other media
Pie (game) (also Pieman or Pieman), an outdoor game for children
Character in manga series Pie (Tokyo Mew Mew)
"The Pie", piebald horse in book and film National Velvet

Computing
Android Pie, version 9 of Android mobile operating system
Pie menu
Pocket Internet Explorer, a browser for Windows CE
Position-independent executable, code that can execute anywhere in memory

Language and typography
Proto-Indo-European language (PIE), a hypothesized ancestor language
Humble pie, an expression reflecting humility or contrition
Pied type, a jumbled mixture of printer's type; See Pi Alley (Boston)

Mathematics and units
Principle of inclusion and exclusion
 Pie chart, a type of circular chart
Indian pie, a former currency unit in India
Pie, a foot length in Spanish customary units

Natural sciences
Pied Pierrot or Pie, a butterfly genus
Post Irradiation Examination, of spent nuclear fuel
Proximity, Immediacy, Expectancy: principles for treating combat stress reaction
U1A polyadenylation inhibition element (PIE), an RNA element

Organizations
Collingwood Football Club, Australia, nicknamed "The Pies"
Juventud Uruguaya de Pie, a former far-right youth organization
Pacific International Enterprises, a film production company and distributor
Paedophile Information Exchange, a UK 1974–1984 pro-paedophile group
Pioneers in Engineering, a student-run organization based at the University of California, Berkeley

Other uses
Pie (loa), a type of spirit in Vodun/Voodoo religion
Piebald or pied, an animal with white and black patches
Prevention of Illegal Eviction from and Unlawful Occupation of Land Act, 1998, a South African law

See also
 List of pies
 Pi (disambiguation)
 Pieing, the act of throwing a pie at someone
 Pye (disambiguation)